Dexter Campbell Kozen (born December 20, 1951) is an American theoretical computer scientist. He is Joseph Newton Pew, Jr. Professor in Engineering at Cornell University. He received his B.A. from Dartmouth College in 1974 and his PhD in computer science in 1977 from Cornell University, where he was advised by Juris Hartmanis.  He advised numerous Ph.D. students.

He is a Fellow of the Association for Computing Machinery, a Guggenheim Fellow, and has received an Outstanding Innovation Award from IBM Corporation. He has also been named Faculty of the Year by the Association of Computer Science Undergraduates at Cornell.

Dexter Kozen was one of the first professors to receive the honor of a professorship at The Radboud Excellence Initiative  at Radboud University Nijmegen in the Netherlands.

He is known for his work at the intersection of logic and complexity. He is one of the fathers of dynamic logic and developed the version of the modal μ-calculus most used today. Moreover, he has written several textbooks on the theory of computation, automata theory, dynamic logic, and algorithms.

Kozen was a guitarist, singer, and songwriter in the band "Harmful if Swallowed". He also holds the position of faculty advisor for Cornell's rugby football club and plays for the Cortland Homer Thundering Herd rugby team.

Awards and Honors
 John G. Kemeny Prize in Computing, Dartmouth College)] (1974)
 Outstanding Innovation Award, IBM Corporation) (1974)
 Fellow, John Simon Guggenheim Foundation (1991)
 Prize Nagrode, Polish Ministry of Education, for paper (1993)
 Stephen and Margery Russell Distinguished Teaching Award, College of Arts and Sciences, Cornell (2001)
 Prize Nagrode, Polish Ministry of Education, for paper (1993)
 ACM Fellow, For contributions to theoretical computer science (2003)
 Fellow, AAAS (2008)
 2001 LICS Test-of-Time Award for the paper (2011)
 Fellow, EATCS (2016)
 McDowell Award, for groundbreaking contributions to topics ranging from computational complexity to the analysis of algebraic computations to logics of programs and verification (2016)
 Weiss Presidential Fellow (2018)
 POPL Distinguished Paper Award for the paper Guarded Kleene algebra with tests: verification of uninterpreted programs in nearly linear time (2020)
 Alonzo Church Award, for his fundamental work on developing the theory and applications of Kleene Algebra with Tests, an equational system for reasoning about iterative programs, published in the paper

References

External links
 Dexter Kozen's homepage
 Harmful if Swallowed homepage

Fellows of the Association for Computing Machinery
Fellows of the American Association for the Advancement of Science
Living people
Theoretical computer scientists
Cornell University faculty
Cornell University alumni
Dartmouth College alumni
American computer scientists
1951 births